Matúš Vallo (born 18 September 1977) is a Slovak politician, architect, urban activist, musician, and the current Mayor of Bratislava. He was elected in 2018 with 36.5% of the vote as an independent politician, and re-elected in 2022 with 60.2% of the vote backed by his own local party Team Bratislava as well as Sloboda a Solidarita and Progresívne Slovensko.

Personal life 
Vallo lives in Bratislava, is married, and has fathered one child. He is the grandson of Miroslav Válek, a former minister of culture for Communist party of Czechoslovakia.

Education 

Matúš Vallo went to secondary school in Rome, Italy. Throughout high school had a great interest in art and geometry, which he went on to combine through architecture. He graduated from The Faculty of Architecture at the Slovak Technical University in Bratislava in 2004. In 2010—2011 he received a Fulbright research scholarship to attend Columbia University where he worked on a project called City Interventions at the Columbia Laboratory for Architectural Broadcasting. At the time he was also running his own architecture firm, Vallo Sadovsky Architects.

Mayor of Bratislava

2018 candidacy 

Matúš Vallo was the first candidate to run for Bratislava mayor in the 2018 municipal elections. Vallo ran for the post as an independent, but with the help and strong support of non-parliamentary political parties Progressive Slovakia and Spolu backed by a group of experts called Team Vallo who have previously worked on project to improve the quality of life in Bratislava which resulted in a book, Plán Bratislava having been published.

Vallo’s main rivals were Václav Mika, the former director of RTVS, the public broadcaster, and the then-mayor Ivo Nesrovnal. During the campaign, Vallo vowed to improve the way the city administration communicates with citizens, make processes more transparent and engage more with the residents. Vallo criticised then-mayor Nesrovnal for his inability to come to agreement with the members of the city council, leading to the deadlock in implementing the new parking policy, stagnating improvement of the cycling infrastructure and other issues. He promised that if elected, he would improve co-operation between the magistrate, the city council and local administrations.

Mayoralty 
Vallo was officially sworn into office as Bratislava's mayor on 7 December 2018.

Transport and parking policies 
One of the first policies Vallo started to work on was the parking policy delays with the implementation of which he has previously criticised his predecessor for. His aim was decide on the framework the city borough and the city council will build upon, in the first half of 2019 Unlike Nesrovnal, Vallo expressed the opinion the rules should be uniform across the city, with a single company managing it. The original proposal included residential parking zones in locations decided by the city boroughs. The yearly parking card for permanent residents would cost €49 for the first car, €150 for the second car and €500 for the third car. Without a parking card, hourly parking fees would incur in said zones. Bratislava would be divided in up to four zones with parking fees from €0.50/h to €2/h depending on the location. The parking card would be accepted only in the city borough the owner is a resident, but they would have up to 2 hours daily for visits outside of that city borough. Special rates would be payable by companies seated in Bratislava.

The proposal caused some backlash, after which some changes were made. The cost of the yearly parking card was reduced to €39; additional €10 a year allow parking in other boroughs for a maximum of two hours. The amended proposal has been approved by the city on 27 June 2020 and was expected to come into force in early 2021.

In October 2020 it was announced that the launch of the parking policy is delayed until the autumn of 2021.

Metropolitan Institute of Bratislava 
Vallo initiated the establishment of the Metropolitan Institute of Bratislava. The Metropolitan institute’s mission is to develop plans, strategies and policies for the city, and to encourage participation of the citizens in the planning process and decision making.

The Metropolitan institute of Bratislava has developed the manifest and the manual for public spaces.

Planning permissions review 
Under Vallo, the review of planning permission became stricter, with more projects being rejected for ignoring or bypassing requirements.

Other
Along with the capitals of the other Visegrád Group countries, Vallo signed the Pact of Free Cities to promote "common values of freedom, human dignity, democracy, equality, rule of law, social justice, tolerance and cultural diversity".

Vallo supports the Bratislava Pride and has attended it both during his mayoral term and before.

References

External links 

Mayors of Bratislava
Architects from Bratislava
Living people
1977 births
Slovak University of Technology in Bratislava alumni
Slovak musicians
Fulbright alumni